The Leamington Kinsmen Recreation Complex was opened in 1985 as the F.T. Sherk Aquatic and Fitness Centre in Leamington, Ontario, Canada.

The complex was expanded in 2000 providing the community with access to 2 ice pads, and a fitness and aquatic centre.

Facilities

Highbury Canco Arena
Added to the complex in 2000 as the Heinz Arena, Highbury Canco Arena is the home of the 2 time defending Western Conference Champion Leamington Flyers of the Greater Ontario Junior Hockey League.  The arena has an Olympic (or international) sized ice surface with bowl seating for up to 2,500 people.  Highbury Canco Arena is also used by local minor hockey teams and the Leamington Skating Club.

The former Heinz Arena name was changed after the main sponsor of the arena, Heinz, ended Canadian production of its products in Leamington. On August 15, 2015, The Heinz Arena became the Highbury Canco Arena

Unico Arena
Unico Arena was also added in the renovations done to the complex in 2000.  The Unico Arena has an NHL (or North American) sized ice pad with seating for 200 people.

The F.T. Sherk Aquatic and Fitness Centre
The original portion of the current complex is the F.T. Sherk Aquatic and Fitness Centre.  This portion of the complex houses:
25 meter indoor saltwater swimming pool
An indoor walking/jogging track
Weight training and cardio fitness rooms
Racquetball and squash courts
Gym
A fitness studio
An indoor cycling studio

The municipality offers gym memberships to the public, and there are currently over 3000 members.

References

External links
Official Website

Indoor arenas in Ontario
Indoor ice hockey venues in Canada
Swimming pools
Leamington, Ontario
Buildings and structures in Essex County, Ontario
1985 establishments in Ontario
Sports venues completed in 1985